Jungfernstieg is an underground railway station in the city centre of Hamburg, Germany, served by the underground railway (U-Bahn) and  the suburban railway (S-Bahn). The station is one of Hamburg's busiest rapid transit hubs.

Most of the station is located underwater. That is, under the Alster River, and the lakes Binnenalster and Kleine Alster respectively. At this location, the Alster also forms the border between the two Hamburg districts Neustadt and Altstadt, both part of the borough of Hamburg-Mitte. The station is named after Jungfernstieg boulevard.

History 
On , a first station was opened as part of the underground Kellinghusenstraße–Jungfernstieg railway line (Kelljung line) — now part of the U1. At first, the platforms were provisional and a little off its current location. On  the proper Jungfernstieg station opened as Europe's first underwater railway station. The station had entrances on Jungfernstieg and Ballindamm, then in 1930s Art Deco fashion.

On , the underground platforms between the Circle Line's Rathaus station and Jungfernstieg station were connected by an underpass, with additional entries on Rathausmarkt and Mönckebergstraße. Both stations were merged into one station and named "Rathaus".

In 1973, the diameter U-Bahn line U2 was completed between Gänsemarkt and Hauptbahnhof Nord, around the same time as the S-Bahn's first section of their so-called "City S-Bahn line" between Hauptbahnhof and Landungsbrücken (since 1975). This now tripartite station was renamed back to "Jungfernstieg", with several connectors between the three parts, and additional entrances at Alstertor and Rathausmarkt. "Rathaus" was remade a separate station, since then only served by Circle Line U3. The 1950s underpass between Rathaus and Jungfernstieg was retained.

On , the U-Bahn's U4 connection between Jungfernstieg and HafenCity Universität was opened, utilizing then unused tracks along the U2 platforms.

Layout  

The station's three platform tubes form a sort of triangle. The 1930s U-Bahn U1 platform follows the course of Reesendammbrücke at two stories below street level. Below that, the S-Bahn platform runs in a slightly curved north-south direction and the U-Bahn U2/U4 platforms at the deepest running approximately east-west.

Entrances  
Jungfernstieg station has over 20 entrances, spread around four ticket halls at Jungfernstieg, Ballindamm, Bergstraße and Rathausmarkt. Most recognizable are two sheltered entrances at the intersection of Jungfernstieg and Neuer Wall. The ticket hall at Bergstraße connects to nearby Rathaus station via a pedestrian underpass; the ticket hall at Rathausmarkt incorporates an underground shopping passage. Each of the three platform areas is linked to two of those ticket halls on either of their respective platforms' ends.

Platforms  
Jungfernstieg station has four island platforms, with one being allocated to U-Bahn line U1, one to the three S-Bahn lines, and two shared by U-Bahn lines U2 and U4. The four tracks for U2 and U4 allow for same-direction cross-platform interchange in each direction. Besides the direct access of each platform to and from the ticket halls, each platform also has a direct connection to at least one of the other lines.

The 1930s built platform for line U1 is noticeably older than all others. When the U4 was added to the two platforms of line U2, the two platforms had to be re-fitted to meet current fire safety regulations. At this undertaking, the platforms for U2 and U4 were made handicap-accessible.

Service 
HVV runs one staffed service centre at Jungfernstieg, along a number of sales points and ticket machines throughout the station. There are also toilets, baby-care rooms, shops and restaurants. Hamburger Hochbahn-Wache has a staffed guard office at Jungfernstieg, along the obligatory CCTV cameras and SOS/information telephones.

Trains 
The lines S1, S2 and S3 of Hamburg S-Bahn and the lines U1, U2 and U4 of Hamburg U-Bahn call at Jungfernstieg station.

Bus 
Among others, HHA metro bus lines 4, 5, and 19 as well as VHH express bus line X3 call at bus stops on the streets above the station.

Ferry  
Jungfernstieg is the central landing pier for Hamburg's Alster ferries; though no longer within the HVV, the ferries are popular as pleasure boats.

See also 

 List of Hamburg U-Bahn stations
 List of Hamburg S-Bahn stations

References

External links 

 Line and route network plans, hvv.de 
 100 Jahre Hochbahn, hochbahn.de 
 Hamburg U-Bahn line U4, hochbahn.de  

Hamburg S-Bahn stations in Hamburg
Hamburg U-Bahn stations in Hamburg
U1 (Hamburg U-Bahn) stations
U2 (Hamburg U-Bahn) stations
U4 (Hamburg U-Bahn) stations
Buildings and structures in Hamburg-Mitte
Railway stations in Germany opened in 1931
Railway stations located underground in Hamburg